Samson Gimson (born 22 January 1964) is a Singaporean professional golfer.

Gimson played on the Japan Golf Tour from 1993 to 1997, winning once.

Career 
Gimson won the gold medal at the 1989 Southeast Asian Games.

Amateur wins
1986 Hong Kong Amateur
1987 Hong Kong Amateur, Sentosa Invitational, Desaru Amateur
1989 Singapore Amateur, Pahang Open Amateur, Perak Amateur Open, Selangor Amateur Open, Southeast Asian Games (gold medal)

Professional wins (9)

Japan Golf Tour wins (1)

Other wins (8)
1990 Singapore PGA Championship
1991 Langkawi TDC Tour, Sarawak TDC Tour, Johor TDC Tour, Labuan TDC Tour, Tiger Beer Open
1998 Anderson Consulting Champions of Champions, Emirates PGA Singapore Championship

Team appearances
Amateur
Eisenhower Trophy (representing Singapore): 1988

Professional
World Cup (representing Singapore): 1990

References

External links

Singaporean male golfers
Japan Golf Tour golfers
1964 births
Living people